German submarine U-71 was a type VII C submarine of Nazi Germany's Kriegsmarine during the Second World War.

Ordered on 25 January 1939, her keel was laid down as yard number 618 on 21 December that year. She was launched on 31 October 1940 and commissioned on 14 December. She entered the 7th U-boat Flotilla as a training submarine (commissioning until 31 May 1941), then served as a front (operational) boat between 1 June 1941 and 31 May 1943.

After that, she moved to the 24th U-boat Flotilla as a training submarine (1 June 1943 – 30 June 1944), then to the 22nd flotilla also as a training boat from 1 July 1944 until 27 February 1945. She was a member of 17 wolfpacks. She sank five ships and was scuttled on 2 May 1945 at Wilhelmshaven, six days before the German surrender.

Design
German Type VIIC submarines were preceded by the shorter Type VIIB submarines. U-71 had a displacement of  when at the surface and  while submerged. She had two shafts and two  propellers.

U-71 was fitted with five  torpedo tubes (four fitted at the bow and one at the stern), fourteen torpedoes, one  SK C/35 naval gun, 220 rounds, and one  C/30 anti-aircraft gun. The boat had a complement of between forty-four and sixty.

Service history

First, second, third and fourth patrols
U-71s early history was fairly typical of many boats in the U-Boot-Waffe (U-boat arm); she began her operational life in Kiel, but soon moved to St. Nazaire in France, where despite being nearer to the main hunting grounds of the Atlantic, failed to take advantage of her more advanced location. This was between August 1941 and January 1942.

Fifth patrol

She returned to France, but this time to La Pallice.

Sixth patrol
Flachenberg was unable to repeat his success on U-71s sixth and his last patrol, returning to St. Nazaire empty-handed.

Seventh, eighth and ninth patrols
Under a new skipper, Hardo Rodler von Roithberg, the boat could not reproduce the form of her fifth patrol, despite sortieing three times between July 1942 and February 1943.

Tenth patrol
By now the writing was on the wall for Germany's U-boats; U-71 was only one submarine that departed La Rochelle and after another unsuccessful voyage, steamed to Königsberg (on the Baltic coast), arriving in May 1943.

Wolfpacks
U-71 took part in 17 wolfpacks, namely:
 Grönland (10 – 27 August 1941) 
 Bosemüller (28 August – 2 September 1941) 
 Seewolf (2 – 3 September 1941) 
 Breslau (2 – 29 October 1941) 
 Seeräuber (21 – 23 December 1941) 
 Seydlitz (27 December 1941 – 16 January 1942) 
 Endrass (12 – 16 June 1942) 
 Wolf (13 – 30 July 1942) 
 Pirat (31 July – 3 August 1942) 
 Steinbrinck (3 – 7 August 1942) 
 Panther (10 – 20 October 1942) 
 Veilchen (20 October – 7 November 1942) 
 Falke (28 December 1942 – 19 January 1943) 
 Landsknecht (19 – 28 January 1943) 
 Hartherz (3 – 7 February 1943) 
 Adler (7 – 13 April 1943) 
 Meise (13 – 17 April 1943)

Summary of raiding history

References

Bibliography

External links

German Type VIIC submarines
U-boats commissioned in 1940
1940 ships
World War II submarines of Germany
Ships built in Kiel
Operation Regenbogen (U-boat)
Maritime incidents in May 1945